Laurent Petitgand (born 28 September 1959 in Laxou, France) is a French composer, songwriter, singer and actor. He is best known for The Salt of the Earth, The Inner Life of Martin Frost (2007), A Trick of Light (1996), Beyond the Clouds, Faraway, So Close! (1992), Notebook on Cities and Clothes (1989), Wings of Desire Zirkus Music (1987), Tokyo-Ga (1985).

Discography

Albums
Je veux voir la Mer (1982) (CD, Album) with Dick Tracy Les Disques Du Soleil Et De L'Acier
Slim Bretzel (1983) (Maxi 45t) with Dick Tracy Les Disques Du Soleil Et De L'Acier
Tokyo-Ga (1985) (LP, BO) with Dick Tracy Les Disques Du Soleil Et De L'Acier
Wings of Desire (Der Himmel über Berlin) (CD, LP, Album) (1987) – with Jürgen Knieper – Nick Cave – Laurie Anderson, etc.
Liqueurs de chair (CD, Album) (1988) Loory Petitgang, music for the ballet of Angelin Preljocaj
L' Or and Kat (LP, Ltd) (1989) Laurie Petigand + GN
Fishes (LP, Ltd) (1989) Laurie Petigand + GN
Lisa (LP, Ltd) (1988) Laurie Petigand + GN
Du sang sur le cou du chat (1989) Rainer Werner Fassbinder
Amer America (CD, Album) (1990) music for the ballet of Angelin Preljocaj
Les Grands Voyageurs (1991) Loory Petitgand + Alain Bashung – Osez Joséphine – Barclay
(Cass, Album) (1991)
(CD, Album) (1991)
(LP, Album) (1991)
(CD, Album, RP) (1992)
(CD, Album, RE, Dig) (1997)
(LP, Album, RE) (2009)
Faraway, So Close! (1993) (CD, Album) Electrola
La Tournée Des Grands Espaces (2004) Loory Petitgand + Alain Bashung – Barclay
(2xDVD-V, PAL) (2004)
(2xCD, Album) (2004)
(2xCD, Album, Dig) (2004)
(2xCD) (2004)
Comme si la terre penchait  (2005) Christophe (singer) 
The Inner Life of Martin Frost (2007) Paul Auster / Sophie Auster
Gamines (2009) – with Toto Cutugno, "Aline" by Christophe
Si J'avais Su, J'aurais Rien Dit (2012) (LP, Album + CD, Album) L. Petitgand + GN chez Ici, d'ailleurs... (Triple LP, Album) Wenders Music 
Je Vous Dis (2014) (LP, Album + CD, Album) L. Petitgand + GN Ici, d'ailleurs...
Oublier (2015) (LP, Album + CD, Album) L. Petitgand + GN Ici, d'ailleurs...
Silver Lining – Driven by Music (2015) (Triple LP, Album) Wenders Music

Soundtracks
Tokyo-Ga (LP, Album) (1985) with Dick Tracy Les Disques Du Soleil Et De L'Acier
Wings of Desire (Der Himmel über Berlin) (CD, LP, Album) (1987) – with Jürgen Knieper – Nick Cave – Laurie Anderson, etc.
 Notebook on Cities and Clothes (CD, Album) (1992)
 Faraway, So Close!  (1993) (CD, Album) avec Lou Reed – U2 – Nick Cave etc. ...
 The Inner Life of Martin Frost (CD, Album) (2007) Naïve Records
 Gamines (online) (2009) 
 The Salt of the Earth (CD, Album) (2015) Idol
 Pope Francis - A Man of His Word (2018)

References

French male composers
French male singer-songwriters
French singer-songwriters
1959 births
Living people